Oocephala centauroides is a plant in the family Asteraceae. It is native to Mozambique, Eswatini and South Africa (Northern Provinces, KwaZulu-Natal).

Description
The capitula feature purplish flowers. The fruits are achenes.

References

centauroides
Flora of Mozambique
Flora of Swaziland
Flora of the Northern Provinces
Flora of KwaZulu-Natal
Plants described in 1896